Christopher Lee Parker (born December 31, 1972) is a former American football running back who played one season with the Jacksonville Jaguars of the National Football League. He played college football at Marshall University and attended Heritage High School in Lynchburg, Virginia.

In 2000 he was inducted into the Marshall Athletics Hall of Fame for his career in football and track & field.

Parker is among the candidates on the 2020 ballot for the College Football Hall of Fame.

College statistics
1993: 339 carries for 1,750 yards (5.16) with 23 TD.
1994: 321 carries for 1,728 yards (5.38) with 23 TD.
1995: 349 carries for 1,833 yards (5.25) with 18 TD.
3 Year Totals: 1,009 carries for 5,311 yards (5.26) with 64 TD.

References

External links
Just Sports Stats
College stats

Living people
1972 births
Players of American football from Virginia
American football running backs
African-American players of American football
Marshall Thundering Herd football players
Marshall Thundering Herd men's track and field athletes
Jacksonville Jaguars players
Sportspeople from Lynchburg, Virginia
21st-century African-American sportspeople
20th-century African-American sportspeople